Cornufer parilis is a species of frog in the family Ceratobatrachidae. Scientists know it exclusively from its the type locality on Isabel Island on the Solomon Islands in Papua New Guinea.

Original description

References

parilis
Frogs of Asia
Endemic fauna of Papua New Guinea
Amphibians described in 2008